Rio Vista Municipal Airport  is a public airport located three miles (4.8 km) northwest of Rio Vista, serving Solano County, California, USA. The airport is the current base of operations for the Travis AFB Aero Club. It opened in 1993, replacing the original Rio Vista Airport.

See also 
List of airports in California
List of airports in the San Francisco Bay Area

References

External links 
Official website, maintained by the City of Rio Vista

Airports in Solano County, California